Ogden is an extinct town in New Madrid County, in the U.S. state of Missouri. The GNIS classifies it as a populated place.

A post office called Ogden was established in 1826, and remained in operation until 1893. The community has the name of the local Ogden family of pioneer citizens.

References

Ghost towns in Missouri
Former populated places in New Madrid County, Missouri